Vincent Ongandzi (born 22 November 1975) is a Cameroonian former professional footballer who played as a goalkeeper.

References

Living people
1975 births
Association football goalkeepers
Cameroonian footballers
Elite One players
South African Premier Division players
Cypriot First Division players
Tonnerre Yaoundé players
Bloemfontein Celtic F.C. players
Apollon Limassol FC players
Cameroon international footballers
1998 African Cup of Nations players
Expatriate soccer players in South Africa
Cameroonian expatriate sportspeople in South Africa
Expatriate footballers in Cyprus
Cameroonian expatriate sportspeople in Cyprus